Khoobsurat may refer to:

 Khubsoorat, a 1980 Bollywood film, starring Rekha
 Khoobsurat (1999 film), a 1999 Bollywood film
 Khoobsurat (2014 film), a 2014 Bollywood film
 Khoobsurat, a 2016 Pakistani television series that aired on Urdu 1

See also
 Khubsurat Bala, a 1910 Urdu play
 Shahrukh Bola "Khoobsurat Hai Tu", a 2010 Bollywood film